Udea monticolens is a moth of the family Crambidae described by Arthur Gardiner Butler in 1882. It is endemic to the Hawaiian islands of Kauai, Oahu and Hawaii.

The larvae feed on Ipomoea bona-nox.

References

Moths described in 1882
Endemic moths of Hawaii
monticolens